Perske is a surname. Notable persons with that name include:

 Betty Joan Perske (1924–2014), birth name of Lauren Bacall, American actress and model
 Robert Perske (1927–2016), American author, theologian, and disability rights activist
 Wayne Perske (born 1974), Australian professional golfer

See also
 Perski